Marie-Andrée Lessard (born 6 December 1977) is a Canadian female beach volleyball player. As of 2012, she plays with Annie Martin. The pair took part in the 2012 Summer Olympics tournament and were eliminated after losing their three pool matches.

References 

1977 births
Living people
Canadian women's beach volleyball players
Beach volleyball players at the 2012 Summer Olympics
Olympic beach volleyball players of Canada
Beach volleyball players at the 2007 Pan American Games
Pan American Games competitors for Canada